The Batanmweight competition at the 2015 AIBA World Boxing Championships will be held from 6–14 October 2015. This is a qualifying tournament for the upcoming 2016 Summer Olympics. Michael Conlan of Ireland defeated Murodjon Akhmadaliev of Uzbekistan to win the world title.

Medalists

Seeds

  Kairat Yeraliyev (round of 16)
  Andy Cruz Gómez (Quarter final)
  Michael Conlan
  Hakan Erseker (Quarter final)

Draw

Finals

Section 1

Section 2

Results

Ranking

References

External links
Official website

2015 AIBA World Boxing Championships